The T18 Boarhound was an American heavy armoured car produced in small numbers for the British Army during the Second World War.

History
In July 1941, the United States Army Ordnance Corps issued specifications for a heavy armored car (along with another specification for a medium armored car, which resulted in the T17 Deerhound and T17E1 Staghound) to be built for supply to the British. The prototype was developed in 1942 by the Yellow Coach Company. It was a large 8x8 (eight wheels, all driven; called an "eight-by-eight") vehicle with four front wheels used for steering. Thick armor brought the weight to 26 tons, about the weight of contemporary medium tanks. Initial armament consisted of a 37 mm gun M6 in a turret with a coaxial .30 inch machine gun and another .30 inch MG in the bow mount. By then, it was clear that the anti-tank performance of the 37 mm gun was insufficient and the production version, the T18E2, which was named Boarhound by the British, received the 57 mm gun M1, the US-manufactured variant of the British QF 6 pounder.

The United States Army had only shown minimal interest in the vehicle and retained the first 3 production vehicles. The British Army placed an order for 2,500 units, but high production costs and poor cross-country performance led to cancellation of the order with only 27 being delivered to North Africa. The T18 was never used widely in combat; however, a number were made use of by defending bases of operation in North Africa, with a few even taking part in convoy operations. There are accounts that a limited few were refitted for special duties in the rear echelon as well. Late in 1942, orders were issued for upwards of some eight Boarhounds to be assigned to the Eighth Army, which used them sparingly as supporting armored vehicles and, to some extent, in reconnaissance roles. None are said to have seen heavy action.

The only surviving vehicle is displayed in The Tank Museum, Bovington, United Kingdom.

Variants
T18 - original version with 37 mm gun.
T18E1 - six-wheeled version. Development stopped January 18, 1943 
T18E2 - version with 57 mm gun.

See also
G-numbers

Notes

References
SNL G133
George Forty - World War Two Armoured Fighting Vehicles and Self-Propelled Artillery, Osprey Automotive.
Haugh, David T18E2 data sheet Warwheels.net
R.A.C Technical Situational Reports No 7

External links
Warwheels.net

World War II armoured cars
World War II armored fighting vehicles of the United States
Armoured cars of the United States
Military vehicles introduced from 1940 to 1944